Nassarius fischeri is a species of sea snail, a marine gastropod mollusc in the family Nassariidae, the Nassa mud snails or dog whelks.

Description
The length of the shell attains 12.4 mm.

Distribution
This species occurs in the Atlantic Ocean off Angola and Namibia.

References

 Gofas, S.; Afonso, J.P.; Brandào, M. (Ed.). (S.a.). Conchas e Moluscos de Angola = Coquillages et Mollusques d'Angola. [Shells and molluscs of Angola]. Universidade Agostinho / Elf Aquitaine Angola: Angola. 140 pp

External links
 Dautzenberg P. (1912). Mission Gruvel sur la côte occidentale d'Afrique (1909–1910): Mollusques marins. Annales de l'Institut Océanographique, Paris (Nouvelle Série) 5(3): 1–111, page(s): 31–32, pl. 1 fig. 37–38
 Cernohorsky W.O. (1984). Systematics of the family Nassariidae (Mollusca: Gastropoda). Bulletin of the Auckland Institute and Museum. 14: 1-356
 Adam, W. & Knudsen, J. (1984). Révision des Nassariidae (Mollusca: Gastropoda Prosobranchia) de l'Afrique occidentale. Bulletin de l'Institut Royal des Sciences Naturelles de Belgique. 55 (9): 1-95, 5 pl.

Endemic fauna of Angola
Nassariidae